Vřeskovice is a municipality and village in Klatovy District in the Plzeň Region of the Czech Republic. It has about 300 inhabitants.

Administrative parts
The hamlet of Mstice is an administrative part of Vřeskovice.

Gallery

References

Villages in Klatovy District